Algimantas Puipa (born 14 June 1951) is a Lithuanian film director and screenwriter. With more than 70,000 admissions, his directed film Whisper of Sin was a success in Lithuania. Other successful films include Forest of the Gods and Elze's Life.

Biography
Puipa graduated from All–Union State Institute of Cinematography located in Moscow in 1974. He directed his first feature film alongside Stasys Motiejūnas the following year. His first successful film was Devil's Seed; it won the Soviet Film Festival Prize for realistic portrayal of the rural life in the early twentieth century. Puipa specializes in drama films.

Selected filmography

References

Further reading
 "Algimantas Puipa: My Work Starts Where the Novel Ends" in Lithuanian Cinema: Special Edition for Lithuanian Film Days in Poland 2015, Auksė Kancerevičiūtė [ed.]. Vilnius: Lithuanian Film Centre, 2015. .

External links
 
 biography on obuolys.lt

1951 births
Living people
People from Zarasai District Municipality
Lithuanian film directors